Smith Beach is an unincorporated community in Northampton County, Virginia, United States. Smith Beach appears on the Cheriton U.S. Geological Survey Map. Northampton County is in the Eastern Time Zone (UTC -5 hours).

References

GNIS reference

Unincorporated communities in Virginia
Unincorporated communities in Northampton County, Virginia